In Indo-European linguistics, the term Indo-Hittite (also Indo-Anatolian) refers to Edgar Howard Sturtevant's 1926 hypothesis that the Anatolian languages may have split off a Pre-Proto-Indo-European language considerably earlier than the separation of the remaining Indo-European languages. The term may be somewhat confusing, as the prefix Indo- does not refer to the Indo-Aryan branch in particular, but is iconic for Indo-European, and the -Hittite part refers to the Anatolian language family as a whole.

Proponents of the Indo-Hittite hypothesis claim the separation may have preceded the spread of the remaining branches by several millennia, possibly as early as 7000 BC. In this context, the proto-language before the split of Anatolian would be called Proto-Indo-Hittite, and the proto-language of the remaining branches, before the next split, presumably of Tocharian, would be called Proto-Indo-European (PIE). This is a matter of terminology, though, as the hypothesis does not dispute the ultimate genetic relation of Anatolian with Indo-European; it just means to emphasize the assumed magnitude of temporal separation.

According to Craig Melchert, the current tendency is to suppose that Proto-Indo-European evolved, and that the "prehistoric speakers" of Anatolian became isolated "from the rest of the PIE speech community, so as not to share in some common innovations." Hittite, as well as its Anatolian cousins, split off from Proto-Indo-European at an early stage, thereby preserving archaisms that were later lost in the other Indo-European languages.

Linguistics

Traditionally there has been a strong notion among Indo-European linguistics that the Anatolian branch was separated earlier than other branches. Within the framework of the Kurgan hypothesis, the split is estimated to have occurred in roughly 4000 BC.

Some fundamental shared features, such as the aorist category of the verb (which denotes action without reference to duration or completion), with the perfect active particle -s fixed to the stem, link the Anatolian languages closer to the southeastern languages such as Greek and Armenian, and to Tocharian.

Features such as the lack of feminine gender in the declensions of nominals, a division between an "animate" common gender and an "inanimate" neuter gender, a reduced vowel system, a tendency towards a greater simplicity of the case system, a less typical Indo-European vocabulary, and other striking features have been interpreted alternately as archaic retentions, which means that the common Indo-European structural features observed in the non-Anatolian branches evolved at a later stage, or just as later innovations being caused by prolonged contacts in typologically alien surroundings "en route" or after their arrival in Anatolia. In favor of the Indo-Hittite hypothesis are the very Indo-European agricultural terminology conserved in Anatolia, otherwise considered the cradle of agriculture, and the laryngeal theory that hypothesizes the existence of one or more additional spirant or stop consonants in the Indo-European parent language that has only been attested in Hittite and of which only traces are left outside Anatolian.

However, in general this hypothesis is considered to attribute too much weight to the Anatolian evidence and as early as 1938 it was demonstrated that the Anatolian group should be placed on the same level as other Indo-European subgroups and not as equal with Indo-European. According to another view the Anatolian subgroup left the Indo-European parent language comparatively late, approximately at the same time as Indo-Iranian and later than the Greek or Armenian divisions. A third view, especially prevalent in the so-called French school of Indo-European studies, holds that extant similarities in non-satem languages in general—including Anatolian—might be due to their peripheral location in the Indo-European language area and early separation, rather than indicating a special ancestral relationship.

Genetics 
Recent paleogenetic studies of population migration reportedly give new credence to Proto-Indo-Anatolian theories, but several linguists have disputed this and believe that genetics cannot accurately describe historical language change.

Investigation
Although most recent studies support the hypothesis that Anatolian split from the remaining PIE languages at an early date, yet the independent researcher Hans Holm (2008) argues for a later split. Using a method that accounts for the distribution of PIE verbs (SLR-D) he rejects an early separation of Anatolian languages altogether and places a genealogical split of Anatolian (and Tocharian) within a more recent grouping together with Greek, Albanian and Armenian, in a single branch together with Indo-Iranian but at a distance from the genealogical splits of Balto-Slavic, Italo-Celtic and Germanic that are included within another branch, thus supporting proponents of an IE expansion that roughly parallels the adoption of the bronze metallurgy.

Hence, a crucial question is whether the Anatolian branch split off before the beginning of the Bronze Age or even the Chalcolithic. A Bronze Age society is usually reconstructed from PIE vocabulary, but it is unclear whether this necessarily holds for inherited vocabulary in Anatolian. The Early Bronze Age starts in Anatolia at least with the beginning of the 3rd millennium BC. In the Caucasus, the Bronze Age begins roughly 3300 BC. It is possible that the Proto-Anatolians were involved with the earliest development of Bronze metallurgy. In any case, while evidence that Anatolian shares common terminology of metallurgy with other branches would speak against Indo-Hittite, discarding the value of this evidence does not automatically favour the concept of Indo-Hittite, since even a 'moderate Indo-Hittite' split around 4000 BC would clearly predate the Bronze Age.

See also
Anatolian hypothesis

Notes

References

Further reading
 Bonfante, Giuliano. “‘Indo-Hittite’ and Areal Linguistics”. In: The American Journal of Philology 67, no. 4 (1946): 289–310. https://doi.org/10.2307/290681.
 BROSMAN, PAUL. "EVIDENCE IN SUPPORT OF PROTO-INDO-HITTITE". In: Folia Linguistica Historica 36, no. Historica-vol-23-1-2 (2002): 1-22. https://doi.org/10.1515/flih.2002.23.1-2.1
 Kloekhorst, Alwin. "The Anatolian stop system and the Indo-Hittite hypothesis". In: Indogermanische Forschungen 121, no. 1 (2016): 213-248. https://doi.org/10.1515/if-2016-0013
 Kloekhorst, Alwin, and Tijmen Pronk. "Chapter 1. Introduction: Reconstructing Proto-Indo-Anatolian and Proto-Indo-Uralic". In: The Precursors of Proto-Indo-European. Leiden, The Netherlands: Brill, 2019. pp. 1-14. doi: https://doi.org/10.1163/9789004409354_002
 . Discusses the Indo-Anatolian hypothesis in the context of the paleogenetics of the region.
 Peyrot, Michaël. "Chapter 13. Indo-Uralic, Indo-Anatolian, Indo-Tocharian". In: The Precursors of Proto-Indo-European. Leiden, The Netherlands: Brill, 2019. pp. 186–202. doi: https://doi.org/10.1163/9789004409354_014
 Sturtevant, E. H. “The Indo-Hittite Hypothesis.” Language 38, no. 2 (1962): 105–10. https://doi.org/10.2307/410871.

Anatolian languages
Indo-European languages
Indo-European linguistics
Indo-European language histories
Proposed language families